Baylor Scott & White Health is a healthcare system based in Dallas, Texas, United States. Formed in 2013 from the merger of Scott & White Health with Baylor Healthcare System, it became the largest non-profit healthcare system in Texas and one of the largest in the country. Its network contains over 50 hospitals and more than 800 patient care sites.

Hospitals 
Baylor Scott & White Health has 52 hospitals across Texas, including some that are joint ventures with other healthcare systems. Below is a list of the hospitals that are owned by Baylor Scott & White Health.

References

External links 

Hospital networks in the United States
Medical and health organizations based in Texas
Organizations based in Dallas